Amisfield is a village in Dumfries and Galloway, Scotland. It is located about 5 miles north of Dumfries and next to the A701 Dumfries to Edinburgh road. The village used to have a railway station, however this closed in 1952.

References

Villages in Dumfries and Galloway